The following is a list of notable Old Alleynians, former pupils of Dulwich College, in south London, England.

Years of birth and death (when listed) are given in full. Years at the college are given last, using two digits if unambiguous. All entries are placed in alphabetical order by surname, paying particular attention to any double-barrelled surnames, in which the letters of the first surname take priority.

Arts and entertainment

Art and photography

Jeremy Deller, artist
Stephen Finer, artist
Stanhope Forbes (1857–1947), artist and member of the once influential Newlyn school of painters.
Stephen Gardiner, OBE (1924–2007), British architect, teacher and writer
Walter Hodges (1909–2004), an English illustrator and author.
James Jarvis, graphic artist
Anthony F. Kersting (1916-2008), photographer
Henry Herbert La Thangue RA (1857–1929), artist.
Gavin Stamp (1948 – 2017), writer and architectural historian
C. F. A. Voysey (1857–1941), English architect and furniture designer (FRIBA, RDI)
Gabriele Finaldi (born 1965), art historian and curator, director of the National Gallery

Drama

Clive Brook (1887–1974), actor
Richard Caldicot (1908–1995), actor
Chiwetel Ejiofor (born 1976), film actor: 1990–1995
Nigel Harman (born 1973), actor
Jeremy Howe, BBC Radio 4 Drama Commissioning Editor, and then Editor of The Archers
Angus Imrie (born 1994), television, radio and stage actor: 2001–2012 (and son of the actress Celia Imrie)
Raza Jaffrey (born 1975), actor
John Francis Lane (1928–2018), actor
Mel Raido (born 1977), actor: 1989–1994 
Rupert Penry-Jones (born 1970), actor: 1982–1989
Jamie Thomas King (born 1981), actor
Michael Powell (1905–1990), film director
Ben Turner (born 1980), actor
Derek Waring (1927–2007), actor
Arthur Wimperis (1874–1953), award-winning script and screenplay writer (Won the Academy Award (Oscar) in 1942 for Best Screenplay for the film Mrs. Miniver)

Entertainment & media

Rowan Ayers (1922–2008), television producer
Lionel Barber, Financial Times editor
Godfrey Barker, journalist and author
Peter Bazalgette, television producer: 64–71
Rob Bonnet, TV sports journalist: 64–71
Clive Bull (born 1959), broadcaster, narrator: 1970–1977
Gordon Burns (born 1942), British journalist and television presenter who became known as the host of Granada TV's popular game show The Krypton Factor.
Nat Coombs, television presenter, comedian and comedy writer
Peter Dimmock, sports broadcaster
Denis Gifford (1927–2000), film historian, comics historian, cartoonist: 1939–41
Jonathan Head, BBC South Asia correspondent: 74–78
Adam Kay (born 1980), writer and comedian
Bob Monkhouse (1928–2003), comedian: 42–45 (expelled)
Adam Shaheen, President, Executive Producer, Cuppa Coffee Studios
Paul Sinha, comedian
David Thomson (film critic)
Peter Warren (born 1939), Canadian investigative journalist, private investigator, former talk radio host and member of the Canadian Association of Broadcasters' Hall of Fame
Martin Young, TV reporter and media trainer

Literature

George Bedborough (1868 – 1940), English bookseller, journalist and writer
Simon Brett (born 1945), Writer
Raymond Chandler (1888–1959), writer: 1900–1905
Hugh de Selincourt (1878–1951), English author and journalist, chiefly remembered today for his tale of village cricket, The Cricket Match (1924)
C. S. Forester (1899–1966), writer: 15–16
Denis Goodwin, script writer: 41(?)-44(?)
Hamish Henderson (1919–2002), Scottish poet, songwriter, socialist, humanist, soldier, and intellectual.
Nigel Hinton (born 1941), writer
Claude Houghton (1889–1961), writer
G. Wilson Knight (1897–1985), English literary critic and academic
Andrew George Lehmann, English art and literary critic
Ian MacCormick (aka Ian MacDonald), (1948–2003), author (Revolution in the Head, The New Shostakovich)
A. E. W. Mason (1865–1948), writer
Tom McCarthy (born 1969), writer short-listed for the Booker Prize
Michael Ondaatje (born 1943), writer winner, of Booker Prize
Jon Silkin (1930–1997), poet
Thomas Sturge Moore, poet and artist (1870–1944)
Graham Swift (born 1949), writer
Dennis Wheatley, occultist writer
P. G. Wodehouse (1881–1975), writer: 1894–1900

Music
John Amis, broadcaster and critic (at Dulwich from 1936 to 1939)
Peter Branscombe (1929–2008), musicologist
Harold Fraser-Simson (1872–1944), British composer, famous for The Maid of the Mountains.
Alan Ray Hacker, OBE (born 1938)
Gordon Jacob (1895–1984), composer
Bill MacCormick, musician (Quiet Sun, Random Hold, 801)
Phil Manzanera (P. G. Targett-Adams) (born 1951), musician with Roxy Music (at Dulwich from 1960 to 1969)
Ray Noble, bandleader and composer
Anthony Payne (1936–2021), composer, elaborated the sketches of Elgar's Third Symphony
David Rhodes, musician, member of 1970s band Random Hold, long-serving collaborator with Peter Gabriel
Max Sedgley, music producer, drummer, DJ
Ed Simons, one half of the Chemical Brothers (at Dulwich from 1986 to 1991)
Neil Thomson, conductor at Philharmonic Orchestra of Goiás

Exploration

Stanley Portal Hyatt (1877–1914) 1885–92 #3817 African explorer and war correspondent
Sir Ernest Henry Shackleton CVO, OBE (1874–1922) 1887–90 was a British Antarctic explorer who led three British expeditions to the Antarctic. He was one of the principal figures of the period known as the Heroic Age of Antarctic Exploration. During the Nimrod expedition of 1907–1909, he and three companions established a new record Farthest South latitude at 88°S, only 97 geographical miles (112 statute miles or 180 kilometres) from the South Pole, the largest advance to the pole in exploration history. Also, members of his team climbed Mount Erebus, the most active Antarctic volcano. For these achievements, Shackleton was knighted by King Edward VII on his return home.

Military

Rear Admiral Martin Alabaster, Flag Officer, Scotland, Northern England and Northern Ireland
Wing Commander Frank Arthur Brock (1884–1918), OBE inventor of the smoke-screen at Zeebrugge in 1918
General Sir Webb Gillman KCB KCMG DSO – former Chief of staff in Mesopotamia.
Lieutenant General Eric Goddard, Indian Army, GOC-in-C Southern Command India
Air Vice-Marshal F. C. Halahan CMG CBE DSO MVO
Berthold Wells Key (1895–1986), CB DSO MC ADC, Major General during Second World War
Group Captain Cyril Nelson "Kit" Lowe (1891–1983), MC DFC RAF, English rugby union footballer, First World War flying ace, and supposedly the inspiration for W. E. Johns' character "Biggles".
Brigadier Geoffrey Rimbault (1908–1991) , British Army officer
Rear Admiral Arthur Skey (1873–1942), recipient of the Order of Saints Maurice and Lazarus in the First World War
Wing Commander G. H. Stainforth (1899–1942), AFC RAF, British Royal Air Force pilot and the first man in the world to exceed 400 mph in an aircraft
Air Commodore Owen Truelove, first man to fly from England to New Zealand in a glider
Brigadier James Whitehead (1880–1955), CB, CMG, CBE, DSO, OStJ, ADC, British Indian Army officer who later became a senior officer in the London Metropolitan Police.
Air Chief Marshal Sir John Willis GBE KCB FRAeS, Vice Chief of the Defence Staff

Victoria Cross and George Cross holders

Seven Old Alleynians have won the Victoria Cross, five in the First World War, 1914–18 (of whom four were killed in action) and two in the Second World War, 1939–45.  Also in the Second World War one OA won the George Cross.

Victoria Cross
First World War
Vice-Admiral Gordon Campbell (1886–1953), VC, DSO
Lieutenant Richard Basil Brandram Jones (1897–1916), VC
Major Alexander Malins Lafone (1870–1917), VC
Major Stewart Walter Loudoun-Shand (1879–1916), VC
Lieutenant Cecil Harold Sewell (1895–1918), VC
Second World War
Lieutenant-Colonel Lorne McLaine Campbell (1902–1991), VC, DSO, TD, MA (he later achieved the rank of Brigadier and was awarded the OBE.)
Captain Philip John Gardner (1914–2003), VC, MC
George Cross
Second World War
Major Herbert John Leslie Barefoot (1887–1958), GC, ARIBA

Philosophy and academia

C. D. Broad (1887–1971), epistemologist, historian of philosophy, and philosopher. 
Robert Gildea, author and Professor of History at the University of Oxford
Hugh Gusterson, author and Professor of Anthropology and International Affairs at the George Washington University.  President American Ethnological Society, 2015–17.
William Keith Chambers Guthrie (1906–1981), Scottish classical scholar, best known for his History of Greek Philosophy, in six volumes.
Sir Charles Hilary Jenkinson, (1882–1961), archivist; founder and definer of modern archival theory and practice
John Lewis (1889–1976), philosopher
K. B. McFarlane (1903–1966), historian
George Edward Moore (1873–1958), one of the founders of the Analytic tradition in philosophy
Arthur Lindsay Sadler (1882–1970), was Professor of Oriental Studies at the University of Sydney
Dominic Shellard, Vice Chancellor of De Montfort University (at the School 1977–1984)
Sir John Sheppard (1881–1968), classical scholar, the first non-Etonian to become Provost of King's College, Cambridge, and openly gay.
Alic Halford Smith, former Vice-Chancellor of Oxford University.
Michael Winterbottom, Classics scholar, Oxford University

Politics, law and business

 

Kweku Etrew Amua-Sekyi (1933-2007), Formerly Justice of the Supreme Court of Ghana and Justice of the Supreme Court of the Gambia
 Sir Gavin Lightman (1939-2020),  barrister, Queen's Counsel, formerly High Court Judge of England and Wales (Chancery Division)
Jonathan Bartley (born 1971), Co-Leader of the Green Party of England and Wales and Leader of the Opposition on Lambeth Council(at Dulwich from 1980–1989)
Jon Benjamin (born 1964), Former Chief Executive, Board of Deputies of British Jews (at Dulwich from 1974–1983)
Eric Arthur Cleugh (1894–1964), Diplomat and former Ambassador to Panama (at Dulwich from 1907–1913)
Sir Alexander Colin Cole (1922–2001), KCB, KCVO, long serving officer of arms at the College of Arms in London and Garter Principal King of Arms, the highest heraldic office in England.
Mark Coombs, billionaire and CEO, Ashmore Group
William Leslie Comyn (1877– ), Shipbuilder and shipowner – built first concrete ship in California USA
Robert Craven, author and entrepreneur (at Dulwich from 1968–1977)
Ian Hay Davison, first chief executive of Lloyd's of London 
Sir Horatio Davies (1842–1912), Victorian London Businessman and Lord Mayor of London.
Nigel Farage (born 1964), Leader of the Brexit Party, former leader of the UK Independence Party and Member of the European Parliament (at Dulwich 1975–1982)
Sir George Vandeleur Fiddes, former Permanent Under Secretary for the Colonies (1916–1921).
David Ford, Leader of the Alliance Party of Northern Ireland and Minister of Justice for Northern Ireland
Edward 'Eddie' George (1938–2009), Governor of the Bank of England: 49–57
Sir Edward Harding, former Permanent Under-Secretary of State for the Dominions and High Commissioner in South Africa.
Sir Clement Hindley KCIE, former Chairman of the Race-course Betting Control Board and Chief Commissioner of Railways in India.
Sir Arthur Hirtzel (1870–1937), GCB, Permanent Secretary of State for India.
Sir William Searle Holdsworth (1871–1944), OM, KC, DCL, HON LL.D, FBA, legal historian and Vinerian Professor of English Law at Oxford University. Author of the 12 volume History of English Law.
Philip Hollobone, Member of Parliament: 1976–1983
Sir John Leonard Hunt (born 1929), British Conservative Party politician.
Peter Lilley (born 1943), Member of Parliament: 1983-2017, Life Peer
Lord Luke of Pavenham KBE JP, businessman and did much for the British Charities Association
Alistair Macdonald, British Labour Party politician.
Horace Brooks Marshall, 1st Baron Marshall of Chipstead, Lord Mayor of London from 1918 to 1919
Chris Mole, Member of Parliament for Ipswich
Sir Ronald Norman OBE DL, businessman and author, honoured for services to urban regeneration in Newcastle and services to Teesside.
Sam Owens, Chief Executive Officer, Petit Tinqueur Holdings
His Excellency Anand Panyarachun (born 1932), Prime Minister of Thailand
Mr Justice Sir A F Peterson, Judge of the Chancery Division.
Peter Prescott (born 1943), barrister, Queen's Counsel and Deputy High Court Judge of England and Wales.
Raj Rajaratnam (born 1957), Chief Executive and Fund manager of New York-based Galleon Group, convicted of insider trading
Sir Colin Rimer (born 1944), Lord Justice of Appeal.
Sir John Ritblat FRICS FSVA (born 1935), property tycoon, principal donor to the John Ritblat Gallery of the British Library
Hartley Shawcross (1902–2003), lawyer and Labour politician, lead British prosecutor at the Nuremberg Trials
John Silkin (1923–1987), Member of Parliament, brother of the below
Samuel Silkin, Baron Silkin of Dulwich (1918–1988), Member of Parliament
Sir Melford Stevenson, High Court judge
Philip Rutnam, Permanent Secretary to the Department for Transport
John Spellar (born 1947), Member of Parliament for Warley
Tin Tut, first High Commissioner for Burma in London.
Iain Vallance, Baron Vallance of Tummel, a British businessman and a Liberal Democrat politician
Sir Nicholas Wall, President of the Family Division, a judge in England and Wales (at Dulwich from 1956–1963)
Cecil Whiteley (1875–1942), Common Serjeant of London; Judge at Mayor's and City of London Court
William Moore, CCO of Ramsay Hall 
Roger Westbrook, British diplomat

Religion

The Very Reverend John Chester Hughes (born 1923)
Right Reverend Reginald Herbert Owen, former Archbishop of New Zealand
The Very Reverend Arthur Wesley Carr (born 1941), KCVO, Dean of Westminster 1997–2006, Anglican divine.
Frank Weston, Missionary Bishop of Zanzibar.

Science and medicine

Dr Alec Coppen (born 1923), MD DSc FRCP FRCPsych
Professor Richard Gaitskell (born 1965), Leading scientist in the search for particle dark matter at Brown University
Sir Richard Tetley Glazebrook KCB, KCVO FRS (1854 to 1935), physicist
Harold Hartley (1878–1972)
Colin Leslie Hewett FRSE (1909–1976) biochemist.
Sir Reginald Murley, KBE, TD, MS, FRCS (1916–1997)
Professor John McKay (born 1939), mathematician
Professor Ali Mobasheri (born 1968), President-Elect, Osteoarthritis Research Society International, Professor of Musculoskeletal Physiology
Robert Neal Rudmose-Brown (1879–1957)
 Tony Sale (1931–2011), British electronic engineer, computer programmer, computer hardware engineer, and historian of computing
Professor Karol Sikora, MA, PhD, MB BChir (born 1948)
Sidney Gilchrist Thomas (1850–1885), inventor of the process of eliminating phosphorus from iron by means of the Bessemer converter
Colin Tudge (born 1943), British science writer
Peter Twinn, mathematician and cryptographer
Sir Cecil Wakeley, 1st Baronet KBE CB (1892–1979), President of the Royal College of Surgeons.

Sport

Athletics
Emeka Udechuku, Olympic Discus thrower (left 1997)
R S Woods, twice represented Great Britain in the Olympics (in 1924 and 1928) in the shot-put.

Cricket
Trevor Bailey (1923–2011), Essex and England cricketer: 37–42
Hugh Tryon Bartlett (1914–1988), England Cricketer (left-handed batsman who played for Sussex and England)
Monty Bowden (1865–1892), England cricket captain
Ruel Brathwaite (born 1985), played first-class cricket
Jim Dewes (born 1957), played first-class cricket for Cambridge University
Arthur Dorman (1862–1914), played first-class cricket for Cambridge University
James Douglas (1870–1958), England cricketer (Cambridge University (three blues) and Middlesex).
Robert Noel Douglas (1868–1957), England cricketer (represented Cambridge University (three blues), Surrey and Middlesex as a right-handed batsman.)
Arthur Gilligan (1894–1976), England cricket captain: 06-14
Frank William Gilligan, OBE, MA (1906–1913), cricketer
Harold Gilligan (1896–1978), England cricket captain
Billy Griffith (Stewart Cathie Griffith), CBE, DFC, TD (1914–1993), an English cricketer and cricket administrator
Chris Jordan (born 1988), Barbados born cricket all-rounder playing for Surrey County Cricket Club, Sussex County Cricket Club and England
John Kiddle (1885–1954), played first-class cricket for the Europeans
Frank King (1911–1996), represented Cambridge University and Dorset
Roger Knight (born 1946), Surrey, Sussex and Gloucestershire cricketer and Secretary of the Marylebone Cricket Club
Neville Knox (1884–1935), England cricketer (fast bowler)
Vikram Kumar (born 1981), cricketer for Cambridge University and Cambridge UCCE
Kenelm McCloughin (1884–1915), first-class cricketer and British Army officer
Kenneth McCormack (1887–1943), played first-class cricket for the Europeans
Will MacVicar (born 1992), cricketer for Loughborough MCCU
Bill Mitchell (1929–2005), cricketer for Oxford University
Eoin Morgan, (born 1986) England cricketer, ODI captain and World Cup winner, plays for Middlesex; also played international cricket for Ireland
Karl Nunes (1894–1958), West Indian cricketer who played in West Indies' first Test in their inaugural Test tour of England as wicketkeeper and captain.
Alex Rackow (born 1996), cricketer for Oxford University
Geoffrey Rimbault (1908–1991) , first-class cricketer
Ernest Shattock (1887–1962), played first-class cricket for the Europeans
W.V. Sherlock, Cricket International for Demerara (first represented Demerara in 1909) and British Guyana
Arthur Skey (1873–1942), played first-class cricket for the Royal Navy
Bill Thomas (1921–2000), played first-class cricket for Cambridge University
Francis Townend (1885–1915), played first-class cricket for the Europeans

Hockey
E.G.S.Hose, Hockey International for England (first represented England in 1897)
P. M. Rees, Hockey International for England (first represented England in 1905) and went on to win gold at the 1908 Olympics
Frank Solbé, Hockey International for England (first represented England in 1897)

Rugby union
See Also Old Alleynian Football Club

Henry Braddon, Rugby union international for New Zealand All Black, who represented Argentina in 1911
E. A. Cleugh, Rugby union international for Uruguay (first represented Uruguay in 1922)
Ian Coutts (born 1928), Scotland international (first capped 1951)
William David Doherty, Rugby union international for Ireland (first represented Ireland in 1921) Later captained Ireland
Grahame Donald, Rugby union international for Scotland (first represented Scotland in 1914)
Mark Easter (born 1982), rugby union footballer (position No. 8 or Flanker) who plays for Northampton Saints
Nick Easter (born 1978), professional rugby union footballer for Harlequins and England
S. Ellis, Rugby union international for England (first represented England in 1880)
David Flatman, prop for the England national rugby union team.
H.T.S. Gedge, Rugby union international for Scotland (first represented Scotland in 1894)
John Eric Greenwood, Rugby union international for England (first represented England in 1912) Later captained England.
Jock Hartley, Rugby union international for England (first represented England in 1902)
N.F.Henderson, Rugby union international for Scotland (first represented Scotland in 1892)
G. A. M. Isherwood, Rugby union international for Great Britain (first represented Great Britain in 1910)
William Leake, Rugby union international for England (first represented England in 1891)
Nick Lloyd (born 1976), rugby union player with Saracens; selected for Scotland in 2006 but had to withdraw due to injury
E.G. Loudoun-Shand, Rugby union international for Scotland (first represented Scotland in 1913)
Group Captain Cyril Nelson "Kit" Lowe MC DFC RAF (1891–1983), English rugby union footballer representing England in 25 consecutive matches, First World War flying ace, and supposedly the inspiration for W. E. Johns' character "Biggles".
Tom Mercey, rugby footballer, England Under 21s, club Saracens
C.T. Mold, Rugby union international for Argentina (first represented Argentina in 1911)
 JEC 'Birdie' Partridge (1879–1965), Welsh born rugby international, capped for South Africa; founded Army Rugby Union
Andrew Sheridan (born 1979), rugby footballer for Sale Sharks and England: 90–98
Kendrick Stark (1904–1988), England international (first capped 1927)
David Trail (1875–1935), represented a forerunner of the British and Irish Lions, known as the Anglo-Welsh on their tour of Australasia in 1904
A.L Wade, Rugby union international for Scotland (first represented Scotland in 1908)
Cyril Mowbray Wells (1871–1963), played Rugby Union for England as well as being a first-class cricketer (represented Cambridge University, Surrey and Middlesex as a right-handed batsman and bowler.)
Eric Cyprian Perry Whiteley (1904–1973), England international (first capped 1931)

Other
A. F. Engelbach, Badminton International for England (first represented England in 1921)
Raymond Dennis Keene, OBE (born 1948), Chess Grandmaster: 59–66
Kieran West MBE (born 1977), Olympic champion oarsman: 86–95

References

 
Alleynians
Old Alleynians